Joelle Franzmann (born December 29, 1978 in Idar-Oberstein, Rhineland-Palatinate) is an athlete from Germany, who competes in triathlon.

Franzmann competed at the first Olympic triathlon at the 2000 Summer Olympics in Sydney, Australia.  She took 21st place overall with a time of 02:05:24. She finished with a swimming time of 19:11, a bike time of 01:05:13, a run time of 00:40:08.

Four years later, at the 2004 Summer Olympics in Athens, Greece, Franzmann placed sixteenth overall with a time of 2:08:18.33. Her swim time was 00:18:54, her bike time 01:10:57 and her run time 00:37:25.

Non-Olympic Triathlons

References

External links
 Official Web Site
 Profile

1978 births
Living people
People from Birkenfeld (district)
German female triathletes
Triathletes at the 2000 Summer Olympics
Triathletes at the 2004 Summer Olympics
Olympic triathletes of Germany
Duathletes
Sportspeople from Rhineland-Palatinate